Cham Kabud (also Romanized as Cham Kabūd) is a village in Gavrud Rural District, in the Central District of Sonqor County, Kermanshah Province, Iran. At the 2006 census, its population was 486, in 119 families.

References 

Populated places in Sonqor County